Trap is a 2015 Filipino drama film directed by Brillante Mendoza and starring Nora Aunor, Julio Diaz, Lou Veloso and Aaron Rivera. Taklub centers on the survivors in the aftermath of the Super Typhoon Haiyan that devastated the central part of the Philippines, especially Tacloban, Leyte and how they picked up their lives a year after the typhoon. It was screened in the Un Certain Regard section at the 2015 Cannes Film Festival. At Cannes it won a commendation awarded by the Ecumenical Jury.

Cast
 Nora Aunor as Bebeth
 Julio Diaz as Larry
 Lou Veloso as Renato
 Aaron Rivera as Erwin
 Ruby Ruiz as Kagawad Duke
 Soliman Cruz
 Rome Mallari as Marlon
 Shine Santos
 John Rendez
 Glenda Kennedy

Production
After Typhoon Haiyan struck the Philippines in 2013, director Brillante Mendoza was asked by others if he would make a film about the disaster, to which he thought could be insensitive for him to exploit the tragedies that have occurred for the victims' lives. Some months later, he was asked by the Department of Environment and Natural Resources to create a documentary film about climate change. For it to have a better impact towards audiences, Mendoza suggested to make a narrative film instead.

In preparing for her role, Nora Aunor interviewed some of the people in Tacloban, Leyte, a city heavily damaged by the typhoon.

Release
Trap was screened on May 19, 2015, in the Un Certain Regard section at the 68th Cannes Film Festival. It was also shown at the Sarajevo Film Festival. The film was also part of the 9th Film and Arts Festival Two Riverside in Poland, the 15th T-Mobile New Horizons International Film Festival in Poland, the 28th Helsinki International Film Festival and the 20th Busan International Film.

Reception
Maggie Lee of Variety called it "an intimate yet detached portrait of survivors of Typhoon Yolanda". Clarence Tsui of The Hollywood Reporter wrote that the film "proves to be very much in line with the director's trademark vision of the world as a bleak, imperfect if not even hopeless place".  Screen International described it as "a choral film shot in urgent, handheld, docu-drama style that illuminates the tragedy and its aftermath via an intertwined series of personal stories".

Manny Lima of Telegra praised the film, saying "Every aspect of their lives from having to fend for themselves due to slow progress of rescue, and the grief they have over their lost loved ones are shown in vivid detail." He did however, criticized the use of the Tagalog language rather than Native Waray.

Awards

References

External links

2015 films
2015 drama films
Philippine drama films
Philippine disaster films
Filipino-language films
Films about natural disasters in the Philippines
Typhoon Haiyan
Films directed by Brillante Mendoza
2010s English-language films